The Spanish Reconcentration policy was a plan implemented by general Valeriano Weyler to relocate Cuba's rural population into concentration camps. The policy was originally developed by the Captaincy General of Cuba Arsenio Martínez Campos as a way to separate rebels from the rural populace who occasionally fed and sheltered them. Under the policy, rural Cubans had eight days to relocate to designated camps in fortified towns, all who failed to obey were to be shot. Housing in camps was often decaying, food was scarce, and disease quickly spread through the camps. By 1898, a third of Cuba's population had been moved into camps and 170,000 civil Cubans died due to their subjected conditions, that was a 10% of the population. The policy is remembered as the first time in history modern concentration camps were constructed.

Background
The plan implemented by Valeriano Weyler to relocate Cuba's rural population into concentration camps, originally developed by Arsenio Martínez Campos as a way to separate rebels from the rural populace who occasionally fed and sheltered them. Affected people had eight days to relocate, and all who failed to obey were to be shot. Housing in camps was often decaying, food was scarce, and disease quickly spread through the camps. By 1898, a third of Cuba's population had been moved into camps and over 400,000 Cubans died due to their subjected conditions. The policy is remembered as the first time in history modern concentration camps were constructed.

Cuban War of Independence
Rebel army leaders Máximo Gómez and Antonio Maceo Grajales instituted a strategy of guerrilla warfare in the countryside, often only engaging in hit-and-run attacks and destroying sugar plantations owned by the country's elite. The rebels received significant support from rural peasants and specifically black plantation workers. A Cuban exile group known as the Cuban Junta had effectively swayed American public opinion onto the side of the rebels. By 1896, the rebels had begun an offensive on the prosperous western end of the island destroying sugar plantations and causing severe damage to Spain's economy.

Spanish administration
Governor of Cuba Arsenio Martínez Campos insisted to Spain that the only path to victory included harsher strategies against the rebels. He reckoned it would be necessary to remove the supportive rural population from rebels in order to streamline offensives. Campos personally could not bring himself to order the forced relocation and resigned.

In 1896, Valeriano Weyler was appointed head of Spanish forces and governor of Cuba. Weyler had previously studied the conflict in Cuba and was a staunch supporter to the idea that the rural population must be relocated for Spain to be victorious.

History
In the autumn of 1896, Weyler decreed that rural Cubans without approved agricultural activities must be moved into camps in fortified towns. All resources and land in the countryside were destroyed so as to not be used by the rebels, livestock was driven into cities, and trade with rural areas was prohibited. By the end of the year, the Cuban countryside was devoid of all common life except for warfare.

Within the camps, disease and starvation began to kill off many of the internees. Despite these horrors, Weyler continued their application.

References

Human rights abuses in Cuba
1890s in Cuba
Military history of Cuba
Military history of Spain
Internment camps